212 (Yorkshire) Field Hospital is a unit of the Royal Army Medical Corps within the Army Reserve of the British Army.

History
The hospital was formed upon the formation of the TAVR in 1967, from the amalgamation of 146th (West Riding and Midland) Field Ambulance, and 50th (Leeds) Field Dressing Station, as the 212 (Sheffield) Casualty Clearing Station. Throughout the Cold War, the hospital was under the command of North East District; and on transfer to war, would re-subordinate to Commander Medical 1 (BR) Corps, to provide 400 beds. During the reforms implemented after the Cold War, the hospital was re-designated as 212 (Yorkshire) Field Hospital. As a consequence of Army 2020, the unit now falls under 2nd Medical Brigade, and is paired with 34 Field Hospital.

Under the Future Soldier programme, the regiment will amalgamate with 201st (Northern) Field Hospital to form 214th (North East) Multi-Role Medical Regiment by 2023.  This new regiment will fall under control of the 2nd Medical Group.

Current Structure
The hospital's current structure is as follows:
Headquarters, at Endcliffe Hall, Sheffield
Headquarters Squadron, at Endcliffe Hall, Sheffield
A Detachment, at Harewood Barracks, Leeds
B Detachment, at Nottingham and Lincoln
C Detachment, at Belle Vue Barracks, Bradford

References

Military units and formations established in 1967
Units of the Royal Army Medical Corps